The Dragonfly class was a class of twin shaft river gunboats of the Royal Navy. Six were planned and five were built: of those five, four were lost in the Second World War. One of the four was HMS Scorpion, a slightly upgunned and better powered version.

Ships

References

Gunboats of the Royal Navy
Gunboat classes